"Rise" is an instrumental written by Andy Armer and Randy 'Badazz' Alpert, first recorded in 1979 by trumpeter Herb Alpert. Released as a single from Alpert's solo album Rise, the song reached #1 on the Billboard charts. It is the instrumental sample for The Notorious B.I.G. hit "Hypnotize".

Background
"Rise" was written by Herb Alpert's nephew Randy, in collaboration with Andy Armer. The A&R representative at A&M Records, Chip Cohen, knew Randy Alpert was into funk and disco music. He asked Randy to rework Tijuana Brass hits as funk tracks. Herb Alpert recalls, "I think we started by playing ‘A Taste of Honey’ or ‘Tijuana Taxi'. And it just felt like the wrong approach. I didn’t feel comfortable playing that way."

As Alpert and Armer were working on Cohen's assignment, they decided to write an original song for Herb as well. The result was "Rise". The song was originally upbeat, but Herb Alpert suggesting slowing it down. Randy reduced the tempo from 120 beats per minute to 100, and the track started to feel appropriately funky.

It reached number one on the U.S. Billboard Hot 100 in October of that year and remained in the top position for two weeks. Herb Alpert thus became the first artist to reach the top of the Hot 100 with a vocal performance ("This Guy's in Love with You", 1968) as well as an instrumental performance. "Rise" was also successful on other charts, peaking at number four on the R&B chart, number 17 on the disco chart  and spending one week atop the adult contemporary chart. The recording also received a Grammy Award for Best Pop Instrumental Performance. Songwriters Armer and Alpert were nominated for a Grammy Award for Best Instrumental Composition.

"Rise" has been frequently requested as a sample by various artists. Randy Alpert declined most of them. When he heard the tape of Notorious B.I.G. rapping over "Rise" he was wildly enthusiastic about it and immediately approved the sample. He later gave Bel Biv DeVoe permission to sample the song, because he was a fan of the group. He declined to let The Sopranos use the song during a scene where someone was being beaten. Alpert also refused to let Pfizer use "Rise" in a campaign for Viagra which would have relied on the double entendre implied by the song's title.

In October 2016 the "Rise Remix EP" was released on the Herb Alpert Presents label. It has seven selections with six remixes as well as the original track.

Personnel
Herb Alpert – trumpet
Tim May, Chris Pinnick – guitar
Abe Laboriel – bass guitar
Mike Lang – acoustic piano
Andy Armer – Fender Rhodes electric piano
Julius Wechter – marimba
Steve Schaeffer – drums
Don Hahn, Don Koldon – engineer

Charts

All-time charts

Covers and samples
A sample of "Rise" is the entire musical groove of the 1997 song "Hypnotize", recorded by The Notorious B.I.G. and co-produced by Sean "Puffy" Combs.
 Bel Biv DeVoe sampled "Rise" in their 2016 song "Run". The song's lyrics also quote The Notorious B.I.G.'s "Hypnotize".

In film and television
Shortly after the song was released in 1979, it was used in the American soap opera General Hospital during the scene where Luke rapes Laura.
Also played in Netflix "Spiderhead" during credits

See also
List of Hot 100 number-one singles of 1979 (U.S.)
List of number-one adult contemporary singles of 1979 (U.S.)
Luke Spencer and Laura Webber

References

Bibliography
The Billboard Book of Top 40 Hits, Billboard Books; 9th Edition, 2010, 

1979 singles
Herb Alpert songs
Disco songs
1970s instrumentals
Billboard Hot 100 number-one singles
Cashbox number-one singles
General Hospital
A&M Records singles